Leading edge is the part of an aerofoil or wing which leads in movement through the air.

Leading edge may also refer to:

Aviation
Leading edge cuff, a fixed aerodynamic device employed on fixed-wing aircraft to modify the airfoil
Leading-edge extension, a small extension to an aircraft wing surface, forward of the leading edge
Leading edge inflatable kite, a single skin kite with inflatable bladders providing structure
Leading-edge slats, aerodynamic surfaces on the leading edge of the wings of fixed-wing aircraft
Leading edge slot, aerodynamic features of the wing of some airplanes to reduce the stall speed and promote good low-speed handling qualities

Companies
Leading Edge Aviation Services
Leading Edge Brands, soft drink marketing and manufacturing company based in Temple, Texas
Leading Edge Group, an Australian-owned buying group
 Leading Edge Computers, an Australian computer store, part of the above group
Leading Edge Products, a computer manufacturer in the 1980s and 1990s
Leading Edge Sports Car Company, a British sports car company in operation from 2002 to 2005 in Norfolk, England

Publications
Leading Edge (magazine), speculative fiction magazine published at Brigham Young University
The Leading Edge, a journal of the Society of Exploration Geophysicists

Other uses
Leading Edge Model D, an IBM-clone computer released by Leading Edge in about 1986
Leading Edge Partnership, programme for secondary schools in England
Leading edge, in electronics, the front edge of a digital signal, a particular signal edge
Leading edge, in marketing, a metaphor for State of the art, the highest level of development, as of a device, technique, or scientific field

See also
 Edge (disambiguation)
 Cutting edge (disambiguation)
 Bleeding edge